GUADEC, the GNOME Users And Developers European Conference, is an annual developer conference, whose prime topic is the development of the GNOME desktop environment and its underlying base software, such as GTK, GStreamer, etc.

The first GUADEC was organised by Mathieu Lacage as a one-off event and attracted around seventy GNOME contributors. It was the first time many of them had met in person. The conference was judged a success, and has been held annually in different locations since then, organised by local volunteers. The size has increased five-fold since the first conference.

Conference history

See also

 List of free-software events
 Libre Application Summit

References

External links

 Official web site
 More information about GUADEC on the GNOME wiki

Free-software conferences
GNOME
Recurring events established in 2000